Caversham is a suburb of Reading, England, located directly north of the town centre across the River Thames. Caversham rises from the River Thames, lying on flood plain and the lowest reaches of the Chiltern Hills. Two road bridges, including Caversham Bridge, and two footbridges join Caversham to the rest of Reading. Named areas within the suburb include Emmer Green, Lower Caversham, Caversham Heights and Caversham Park Village. Notable landmarks include Caversham Court, a public park and former country house; Caversham Lakes; and part of the Thames Path national trail. 

With the exception of the centre of Caversham and Emmer Green, which were traditional villages, much of the development occurred during the 20th century. In 1911, it was transferred to Berkshire and became part of the county borough of Reading.

History

 
The first written description of Caversham as Cavesham appeared in the Domesday Book (1086) within the hundred of Binfield. This entry indicates that a sizeable community had developed with a considerable amount of land under cultivation. Robert de Montfort and Henry of Essex fought in front of Henry II under a bridge by the village. The martial Earl of Pembroke, who was a protector of Henry III, died in Caversham in the 13th century.

Some time before 1106 a shrine to the Virgin Mary was established in Caversham. Its precise location is unknown, but it may have been near the present St Peter's Church. It became a popular place of pilgrimage, along with the chapel of St. Anne on the bridge and her well, whose waters were believed to have healing properties. By the 15th century the statue was plated in silver; Catherine of Aragon is recorded as visiting here on 17 July 1532. The shrine was destroyed on 14 September 1538 under the command of Henry VIII. Only the well survives, now dry and surrounded by a protective wall, topped with a domed iron grill. A modern shrine to Our Lady has been re-established at the Roman Catholic Church of Our Lady and St. Anne.

In the Middle Ages Caversham Manor was one of the demesnes of William Marshal, Earl of Pembroke and regent during King Henry III's minority. It was the place of his death. The medieval community was clustered on the north side of Caversham Bridge east of St Peter's Church, which was built in the 12th century. The third Earl of Buckingham donated the land for the church and neighbouring rectory, together with a considerable amount of land around it, to the Augustinian Notley Abbey near Long Crendon in Buckinghamshire. After the Dissolution of the Monasteries, these lands were given to Christ Church. The rectory stood in what is now Caversham Court park and herb garden where there are remains with information panels and flat foundation stones as well as a ha ha wall below giving a view over the River Thames and much of Reading and Tilehurst.

In the Civil War there was fierce fighting around Caversham Bridge for a short time in April 1643. Reading had been held by Royalists and was besieged by a Parliamentary force under the Earl of Essex. Royalists marched south from Oxford to try to relieve the town's defenders but were heavily defeated, and the town fell to the Parliamentarians a few days later. The fortified manor house was replaced by Caversham House  and Park in the 16th century. Several houses have stood on the site, notably the home of William Cadogan. The present Caversham Park House, built in 1850, is occupied by BBC Monitoring, which is a section of the BBC World Service that analyses news, information and comment gathered from mass media around the world. It is also the premises of the BBC Written Archives Centre and BBC Radio Berkshire. The BBC announced in July 2016 that it planned to leave the site and transfer its operations elsewhere. Caversham was an urban district and part of Oxfordshire until 9 November 1911, when it was transferred to Berkshire and became part of the county borough of Reading.

Governance 
Caversham is entirely within the borough of Reading and forms all or part of four of the borough's sixteen electoral wards: Caversham, Caversham Heights, Emmer Green and Thames wards. Caversham is in the Reading East parliamentary constituency, currently represented by Matt Rodda of the Labour Party. The 2016 Boundary Commission review recommended moving one of Caversham's wards, Mapledurham, into the Reading West parliamentary constituency, but after consultation, this proposal was reverted in the 2018 recommendations.

Geography 
The shopping area and immediate residential surrounds that form Central Caversham are surrounded by more recent developments that form bolt-on additions to the suburb: Caversham Heights on the higher ground to the west, Lower Caversham to the south east, and Caversham Park Village to the north east on what was the parkland of Caversham Park. Emmer Green, to the north, is an older village but is generally considered part of Caversham. Elevations of homes vary from 37m above mean sea level to 92m at the top of Caversham Park, three metres short of the highest point in the east of the area. The bank of the river has the Thames Path National Trail except to the west of Caversham, where it reverses banks at Reading Bridge.

Between Mapledurham on the Thames and Caversham Heights, adjoining their respective golf courses is a western narrow outcrop of the northern foothills that reaches 95m AOD. The low Chiltern Hills on the north bank of the River Thames are therefore higher than the land on the opposite bank, providing wide views to the south. On the northern edge of Caversham is the Local nature reserve of Clayfield Copse. The carved Caversham village sign, carved by a local craftsman, is mounted on a tall Oak post in the village centre.

Demography 
Caversham including Emmer Green (the north bank) had: 22.1% of its homes being socially or privately rented in 2011, whereas the borough had 42.4%. This broad area had 20.4% of Reading's population and 23.5% of the borough, with the north bank's homes occupying 29.1% of the footprint of the whole borough's homes. It had 5.7% of the borough's non-domestic buildings footprint. The same figures (where Emmer Green is excluded from analysis) are that Caversham more narrowly defined, as is becoming more common, saw 24.8% of its homes rented against the borough's 42.4%, the same area had 15.3% of Reading's population and 16.4% of the borough's area with its homes occupying 20.6% of the footprint of the whole borough's homes. It had 4.3% of the borough's non-domestic buildings footprint.

At the 2011 census the proportion of homes that were rented as opposed to owned was close to 50% of the average for the borough. The area had 15.3% of Reading's population and 16.4% of the borough's area. In keeping with a suburb, in 2005 the Office for National Statistics land use statistics published with the census, Caversham had 4.3% of the non-domestic buildings. Almost wholly low rise where developed, its homes occupied 20.6% of the footprint of all homes in the borough.

Transport 
Caversham Bridge, Reading Bridge, Christchurch Bridge, and Caversham Lock provide crossing points (the last two for pedestrians only), with Sonning Bridge also available a few miles east of Caversham.

Education 
There is one local authority secondary school in Caversham, Highdown School. Many children from the area also attend Maiden Erlegh Chiltern Edge in South Oxfordshire. In the independent sector, Queen Anne's School educates girls between the ages of 11 and 18, Hemdean House School has mixed infants and junior schools, and a girls senior school. There is also Caversham Preparatory School, which takes children from ages 3 to 11. There are several primary schools in Caversham including Caversham Primary School, Caversham Park Primary School, Emmer Green Primary School, The Hill Primary School, St. Anne's RC Primary School, St. Martin's RC Primary School, Micklands Primary School and Thameside Primary School.

There is a shortage of primary school places in the west of Caversham, but a 2006 proposal to use part of Mapledurham playing fields to build a replacement for Caversham Primary School did not receive public support. A new Heights Primary School  took its first pupils in September 2014 in temporary accommodation, and has not yet found a permanent site. The Education Funding Authority acquired a site (previously residential) in Upper Warren Avenue during 2014, but there was criticism of the choice from local residents. After representations from affected constituents, the local MP, Rob Wilson, intervened. Following discussions with the EFA, Reading Borough Council was commissioned to work with local stakeholders on alternative sites. Five possibilities were proposed – two parks, a wildlife site, a residential site and a field in adjoining Oxfordshire. The subsequent consultation showed a clear preference for occupying a small part of Mapledurham playing fields (5%).

The consultation is not binding, and there remain some legal difficulties. It is in trust for recreation purposes and was gifted by the late Mr Hewett to residents of Mapledurham and Reading. Yet there would also be significant benefits for the community; the children of the area would have a school within walking distance, the recreation land would be used by the community more and the centre of Caversham's traffic would be reduced. Caversham has several nursery schools, one of which, New Bridge Nursery School was assessed by Ofsted in 2011 as 'outstanding'. Chiltern College, once a training school for childminders, now provides training in all aspects of child care, and claims to be the only childcare training college in the United Kingdom with its own nurseries, school, training college and residential accommodation on campus.

Sport
Caversham AFC is one of the largest youth football clubs in the area with many of its girls' and boys' youth teams competing in the top divisions of local leagues. Caversham AFC's main ground is Clayfield Copse, commonly referred to as "Swan's Lair" because the mascot for the team is a swan. In previous seasons, Highdown School has been used as Caversham AFC's training ground. The club colours are red and black. Their main rivals are Caversham Trents FC who also have boys teams competing in many of  the same divisions as their AFC counterparts who are also known to use Highdown School as their training ground. The club colours are blue and white and their main ground is Mapledurham Playing Fields. The Albert Road recreation ground offers facilities for tennis, croquet, and bowls.

Religious sites 
There are many Anglican churches in the Caversham area. St Peter's is the parish church of the Caversham, Thameside, and Mapledurham parish, which also includes St John's and St Margaret's, in the neighbouring Mapledurham village. There are also two Methodist Churches, the Catholic church of Our Lady and St. Anne, Caversham Baptist Church, Grace Church Caversham (which is part of Newfrontiers, and the Pentacostal New Testament Church of God. Caversham Park Village Church meets in Caversham Park Primary School each Sunday and is an ecumenical project made up of Anglicans, Baptists and Methodists. Finally, Caversham Evangelical Church meets at the Youth and Community Centre in Emmer Green.

Notable people 
Fran Kirby

See also
Reading (Borough and Town)
Caversham Court foundations, herb garden and park 
Caversham Lakes
Redgrave Pinsent Rowing Lake
Caversham Lock
Thames Path National Trail
Caversham, New Zealand a suburb of Dunedin named after Caversham

Notes

References

Attribution

External links

Royal Berkshire History: Caversham
Lecture on "Old Caversham", W. Wing, 1894. Full-text transcription.
Caversham.info – local Caversham community website

Populated places on the River Thames
Suburbs of Reading, Berkshire